The 2019 Braintree District Council election took place on 2May2019 to elect members of Braintree District Council in England. This was on the same day as other local elections.

Some minor ward boundary changes were made in February2019. 49members were elected from 26wards.

Before the election, an alliance was formed between the Liberal Democrats, Greens and the two Independent candidates standing in Coggeshall, such that the two parties did not stand against each other in most wards, and neither stood in Coggeshall. The elected Green and Independent councillors formed a political group on the new Council.

The election returned a much reduced Conservative majority, down from 39 in 2015 to 19. The Green and Independent group became the largest opposition for the first time, with 8 seats, entirely in the southeast of the district.

Summary

Candidates by party

Results

Results by ward

Bocking Blackwater

Bocking North

Bocking South

Braintree Central and Beckers Green

Braintree South

Braintree West

Bumpstead

Coggeshall

Gosfield and Greenstead Green

Great Notley and Black Notley

Halstead St Andrews

Halstead Trinity

Hatfield Peverel and Terling

Hedingham

Kelvedon and Feering

Rayne

Silver End and Cressing

Stour Valley North

Stour Valley South

The Colnes

Three Fields

Witham Central

Witham North 

Labour gained one of the Conservative seats in a 2016 by-election.

Witham South

Witham West

Yeldham

By-elections

Hatfield Peverel and Terling

Witham South

Braintree South

Coggeshall

References

Notes 

Braintree District Council elections
2019 English local elections
May 2019 events in the United Kingdom
2010s in Essex